The 1982–83 Coppa Italia, the 36th Coppa Italia was an Italian Football Federation domestic cup competition won by Juventus.

Group stage

Group 1

Group 2

Group 3

Group 4

Group 5

Group 6

Group 7

Group 8

Round of 16

Quarter-finals

Semi-finals

Final

First leg

Second leg

Juventus won 3-2 on aggregate.

Top goalscorers

References

 Official site
 Bracket
 rsssf.com

Coppa Italia seasons
Coppa Italia
Coppa Italia